Sustainable Development Goal 14 (Goal 14 or SDG 14) is about "Life below water" and is one of the 17 Sustainable Development Goals established by the United Nations in 2015. The official wording is to "Conserve and sustainably use the oceans, seas and marine resources for sustainable development". The Goal has ten targets to be achieved by 2030. Progress towards each target is being measured with one indicator each.

The first seven targets are outcome targets: Reduce marine pollution; protect and restore ecosystems; reduce ocean acidification; sustainable fishing; conserve coastal and marine areas; end subsidies contributing to overfishing; increase the economic benefits from sustainable use of marine resources. The last three targets are means of implementation targets: To increase scientific knowledge, research and technology for ocean health; support small scale fishers; implement and enforce international sea law. One indicator (14.1.1b) under Goal 14 specifically relates to reducing impacts from marine plastic pollution.

Oceans and fisheries support the global population's economic, social and environmental needs. Oceans are the source of life of the planet and the global climate system regulator. They are the world's largest ecosystem, home to nearly a million known species. Oceans cover more than two-thirds of the earth's surface and contain 97% of the planet's water. They are essential for making the planet livable. Rainwater, drinking water and climate are all regulated by ocean heat content and currents. Over 3 billion people depend on marine life for their livelihood. However, there has been a 26 percent increase in acidification since the industrial revolution. Effective strategies to mitigate adverse effects of increased ocean acidification are needed to advance the sustainable use of oceans.

According to the 2020 report on progress towards the Sustainable Development Goals, the current efforts to protect oceans, marine environments and small-scale fishers are not meeting the need to protect the resources. One of the key drivers of global overfishing is illegal fishing. It threatens marine ecosystems, puts food security and regional stability at risk, and is linked to major human rights violations and even organized crime.

Background 
The Sustainable Development Goals are a collection of 17 global goals set by the United Nations. The broad goals are interrelated though each has its own targets to achieve. The SDGs cover a broad range of social and economic development issues. These include poverty, hunger, health, education, climate change, gender equality, water supply, sanitation, energy, urbanization, environment and social justice.

The outcome document of the UN Summit on the 2030 Agenda: "Transforming our world: the 2030 Agenda for Sustainable Development", includes an emphasis "to protect the planet from degradation, including sustainable consumption and production, sustainably managing its natural resources and taking urgent action on climate change, so that it can support the needs of the present and future generations."

A full 30 percent of marine habitats have been destroyed, and 30 percent of the world's fish stocks are over-exploited. Marine pollution has reached shocking levels; each minute, 15 tons of plastic are released into the oceans. 20 percent of all coral reefs have been destroyed irreversibly, and another 24 percent are in immediate risk of collapse. Approximately 1 million sea birds, 100,000 marine mammals, and an unknown number of fish are harmed or die annually due to marine pollution caused by humans. It has been found that 95 percent of fulmars in Norway have plastic parts in their guts. Microplastics are another form of marine pollution.

The deterioration of coastal waters has become a global occurrence, due to pollution and coastal eutrophication (overflow of nutrients in water), where similar contributing factors to climate change can affect oceans and negatively impact marine biodiversity. "Without concerted efforts, coastal eutrophication is expected to increase in 20 per cent of large marine ecosystems by 2050."

Characterized by extinctions, invasions, hybridizations and reductions in the abundance of species, marine biodiversity is currently in global decline. "Over the past decades, there has been an exponential increase in human activates in and near oceans, resulting in negative consequences to our marine environment." Made evident by the degradation of habitats and changes in ecosystem processes, the declining health of the oceans has a negative effect on people, their livelihoods and entire economies, with local communities which rely on ocean resources being the most affected. Poor decisions in resource management can compromise conservation, local livelihood, and resource sustainability goals. "The sustainable management of our oceans relies on the ability to influence and guide human use of the marine environment."

Oceans alleviate the impact of climate change and absorb around 23% of the annual emissions of various forms of carbons, the most concerning being carbon dioxide. Because of the absorbed carbons, seawater becomes more acidic and its pH levels drops significantly. Ocean acidification puts coral reefs and other species in danger which impacts the marine food chain and ecosystem services including fisheries, transportation and even tourism.

Targets, indicators and progress 

The UN has defined 10 targets and 10 indicators for SDG 14 that include preventing and reducing marine pollution and ocean acidification, protecting marine and coastal ecosystems, and regulating fishing. The targets also call for an increase in scientific knowledge of the oceans. Some targets have a target year of 2020, some have a target year of 2025 and some have no end year.

The ten targets include reducing marine pollution (14.1), protecting and restoring ecosystems (14.2), reducing ocean acidification (14.3), sustainable fishing (14.4), conserving coastal and marine areas (14.5), ending subsidies contributing to overfishing (14.6), increase the economic benefits from sustainable use of marine resources (14.7), increase scientific knowledge (14.a), supporting small scale fishers (14.b) and implementing and enforcing international sea law (14.c).

Most SDG 14 targets are not measurable in quantitative terms because the data is not available yet; only target 14.5 is quantifiable.

Target 14.1: Reduce marine pollution 
The full title of Target 14.1 is: "By 2025, prevent and significantly reduce marine pollution of all kinds, in particular from land-based activities, including marine debris and nutrient pollution."

It has one indicator: Indicator 14.1. is the "Index of coastal eutrophication and floating plastic debris density"

The "Index of Coastal Eutrophication (ICEP), refers to the inputs of nutrients (nitrogen, phosphorus and silica, in different forms) from rivers, and corresponding nutrient-ratio sub-indicator." The methodology for ICEP will be developed and ready by 2020. No data is available for this indicator yet.

The "Floating Plastic Debris Density" refers to the modelled macro and micro plastics distribution in the ocean. If the quantities of floating micro is below 4.75mm, it is labeled as micro and if it is over 4.75 cm, it is labeled as macro. The amount of plastics in large marine ecosystems are measured based on "a model of surface water circulation and the use of proxy inputs". The final Floating Plastics Debris Density indicators will be ready by 2020.

Despite pervasive global pollution from plastics, there is only one indicator (14.1.1b) under Goal 14, specifically related to reducing impacts from plastics. For all other sustainable development goals, there is no specific target in decreasing microplastics due to limitations of data. Furthermore, there are no targets in reference to reducing microplastics, thus presenting a large challenge for governments to report and monitor microplastics in the environment.

Marine pollution from plastics

Target 14.2: Protect and restore ecosystems 
The full title of Target 14.2 is: "By 2020, sustainably manage and protect marine and coastal ecosystems to avoid significant adverse impacts, including by strengthening their resilience, and take action for their restoration in order to achieve healthy and productive oceans".

This target has one indicator: Indicator 14.2.1 is "Number of countries using ecosystem-based approaches to managing marine areas". This indicator aims at protecting and managing sustainably the marine and coastal ecosystems to avoid adverse impacts. An exclusive economic zone (EEZ) is a sea zone prescribed by the 1982 United Nations Convention on the Law of the Sea over which a sovereign state has special rights regarding the exploration and use of marine resources, including energy production from water and wind.

No data is available for this indicator yet.

Target 14.3: Reduce ocean acidification 

The full title of Target 14.3 is: "Minimize and address the impacts of ocean acidification, including through enhanced scientific cooperation at all levels".

This target has one indicator: Indicator 14.3.1 is the "Average marine acidity (pH) measured at agreed suite of representative sampling stations".

No data is available for this indicator yet.

Ocean acidification is directly addressed by the target SDG 14.3. Ocean acidification is impacting on the ecosystems of marine environments that provide food, livelihoods, and other ecosystem services for a large proportion of the human population. Some 1 billion people are wholly or partially dependent on the ecosystem services provided by coral reefs in terms of fishing, tourism, and coastal management. SDG 14 is fully intertwined with the impacts of ocean acidification, as its focus includes the protection and restoration of ecosystems, sustainable fishing, protection of coastal and marine areas and protecting the economic benefits derived from marine resources.

Target 14.4: Sustainable fishing 

The full title of Target 14.4 is: "By 2020, effectively regulate harvesting and end overfishing, illegal, unreported and unregulated fishing and destructive fishing practices and implement science-based management plans, in order to restore fish stocks in the shortest time feasible, at least to levels that can produce maximum sustainable yield as determined by their biological characteristics".

This target has one indicator: Indicator 14.4.1 is "the proportion of fish stocks within biologically sustainable levels". This indicator aims to measure the proportion of global fish stocks which are overexploited, fully exploited and not fully exploited. A levels of fish stocks is sustainable if it is underexploited or fully exploited. Overexploited fish stocks are unsustainable. Sustainable fisheries means leaving enough fish in the ocean while also respecting habitats and ensuring people who depend on fishing can maintain their livelihoods. According to the World Wide Fund for Nature (WWF), more than 3 billion people rely on fish from marine and inland fisheries as a main source of protein. According to the FAO, Fisheries sustain millions of jobs and often pass down traditions and knowledge from generation to generation.

A report at the High-level Political Forum on Sustainable Development in 2021 stated that: "Sustainable fisheries accounted for approximately 0.1 per cent of global GDP in 2017".

Target 14.5: Conserve coastal and marine areas 

The full title of Target 14.5 is: "By 2020, conserve at least 10 per cent of coastal and marine areas, consistent with national and international law and based on the best available scientific information".

This target has one indicator: Indicator 14.5.1 is the "coverage of protected areas in relation to marine areas".

The term "Marine Protected Areas" include marine reserves, fully protected marine areas, no-take zones, marine sanctuaries, ocean sanctuaries, marine parks, locally managed marine areas and other. Each area has a specific level of protection and a specific allowed range of activities.

This indicator was met by the Swedish government in 2017. Conserving coastal and marine areas has many benefits including maintaining the biodiversity and endangered species, providing areas where fish are able to reproduce, swan and grow to their adult size, maintaining local cultures, economies and livelihoods that are linked to the marine environment.

Also ,It was reported that Canada has protected approximately 793,906 km2 or 13.81% of Canada’s marine and coastal areas, and promised 25% of marine and coastal areas by 2025 and 30% by 2030. The Ocean Protection Plan summarizes Canada's national approach to SDG 14, with Fisheries and Oceans Canada serving as the federal focus on SDG 14.

It was reported in 2021 that "mean protected area coverage of marine key biodiversity areas increased globally from 28 per cent in 2000 to 44 per cent in 2020".

There are a number of global examples of large marine conservation areas. The Papahānaumokuākea Marine National Monument, is situated in the central Pacific Ocean, around Hawaii, occupying an area of 1.5 million square kilometers. Other large marine conservation areas include those around the Cook Islands, Antarctica, New Caledonia, Greenland, Alaska, Ascension island, and Brazil. As areas of protected marine biodiversity expand, there has been an increase in ocean science funding, essential for preserving marine resources. In 2020, only around 7.5 to 8% of the global ocean area falls under a conservation designation.

Target 14.6: End subsidies contributing to overfishing 
The full title of Target 14.6 is: "By 2020, prohibit certain forms of fisheries subsidies which contribute to overcapacity and overfishing, eliminate subsidies that contribute to illegal, unreported and unregulated fishing and refrain from introducing new such subsidies, recognizing that appropriate and effective special and differential treatment for developing and least developed countries should be an integral part of the World Trade Organization fisheries subsidies negotiation".

This target has one indicator: Indicator 14.6.1 is the "Degree of implementation of international instruments aiming to combat illegal, unreported and unregulated fishing".

In December 2016, the US government officially established the Seafood Import Monitoring Program to address illegal, unreported and unregulated (IUU) fishing products entering the market. One of the key drivers of global overfishing is illegal fishing. It threatens marine ecosystems, puts food security and regional stability at risk, and is linked to major human rights violations and even organized crime.

The WWF estimates that the global losses of illegal fishing cost up to $36.4 billion each year.

Negotiations for Target 14.6 were in their final stages to ending harmful fisheries in 2020. The deadline was set for June 2020, but due to the COVID-19 pandemic this was delayed, which has caused concerns in regards to the ability to support the fishing sector.

Target 14.7: Increase the economic benefits from sustainable use of marine resources 
The full title of Target 14.7 is: "By 2030, increase the economic benefits to small island developing states and least developed countries from the sustainable use of marine resources, including through sustainable management of fisheries, aquaculture and tourism".

This target has one indicator: Indicator 14.7.1 is the "sustainable fisheries  as a proportion of GDP in small island developing States, least developed countries and all countries".

No data is available for this indicator yet.

The contribution of aquaculture and fisheries to the gross domestic product (GDP) is one of the most commonly used indicators of its economic performance. According to the FAO, "around 57 million people worked in the primary sector of capture fisheries, the vast majority in small-scale fisheries."

Fisheries and aquaculture can contribute to alleviating poverty, hunger, malnutrition and economic growth. The contribution of sustainable fisheries to the global GDP was around 0.1% per year.

Non-living resources of the ocean (seabed mining) 

One resource issue that should be taken account of to a higher degree than present within the SDGs are non-living resources. Mining will always be a controversial though necessary activity. The balance between mining and marine environment will be one that can be assisted by a greater focus from SDG 14. Marine minerals include sea-dredged and seabed minerals. Sea-dredged minerals are normally extracted by dredging operations within coastal zones, to maximum sea depths of about 200 m. Minerals normally extracted from these depths include sand, silt and mud for construction purposes, mineral rich sands such as ilmenite and diamonds. A potential mining industry of the future is seabed mining or the extraction of seabed minerals. Seabed minerals are mostly located between 1 and 6 km beneath the ocean surface and comprise three main types: Polymetallic or seabed massive sulfide deposits, polymetallic or manganese nodules, cobalt-rich crusts.

At the present time (2021) there is no commercial mining of seabed minerals. Mining of the seabed is a controversial issue, as it will inevitably have some deleterious environmental and biospheric impacts. Some argue that there should be a total ban on seabed mining. Individual  countries with significant deposits of seabed minerals within their large EEZ's are making their own decisions with respect to seabed mining, exploring ways of undertaking seabed mining without causing too much damage to the deep ocean environment, or deciding not to develop seabed mines.

Target 14.a: Increase scientific knowledge, research and technology for ocean health 
The full title of Target 14.a is: "Increase scientific knowledge, develop research capacity and transfer marine technology, taking into account the Intergovernmental Oceanographic Commission Criteria and Guidelines on the Transfer of Marine Technology, in order to improve ocean health and to enhance the contribution of marine biodiversity to the development of developing countries, in particular small island developing States and least developed countries".

This target has one indicator: Indicator 14.a.1. is the "proportion of total research budget allocated to research in the field of marine technology". This indicators aims to improve ocean health and to enhance the contribution of marine biodiversity to the development of developing countries, in particular small island developing States and least developed countries.

Target 14.b: Support small scale fishers 

The full title of Target 14.b is: "Provide access for small-scale artisanal fishers to marine resources and markets".

This target has one indicator: Indicator 14.b.1. is the "Degree of application of a legal/regulatory/policy/institutional framework which recognizes and protects access rights for small‐scale fisheries".

No data is available for this indicator yet.

Small-scale fisheries contribute to the nutrition, food security, sustainable livelihoods and poverty alleviation – especially in developing countries, according to the FAO. Its mission is to also to recognize the small-scale fisheries sector dependents should be empowered to participate in decision-making with dignity and respect through integrated management of the social, economic and ecological systems.

Target 14.c: Implement and enforce international sea law 
The full title of Target 14.c is: "Enhance the conservation and sustainable use of oceans and their resources by implementing international law as reflected in the United Nations Convention on the Law of the Sea, which provides the legal framework for the conservation and sustainable use of oceans and their resources, as recalled in paragraph 158 of "The future we want".

This target has one indicator: Indicator 14.c.1. is the "number of countries making progress in ratifying, accepting and implementing through legal, policy and institutional frameworks, ocean-related instruments that implement international law, as reflected in the United Nations Convention on the Law of the Sea".

A report in 2021 stated that: "Many States have ratified or acceded to the United Nations Convention on the Law of the Sea (168 parties) and its implementing agreements (150 parties for the Agreement relating to the implementation of Part XI of the United Nations Convention on the Law of the Sea and 91 parties for the United Nations Fish Stocks Agreement)."

Custodian agencies 
Custodian agencies are in charge of measuring the progress of the indicators:

 For Indicators under Targets 14.1 and 14.2: UN Environment (United Nations Environment Programme/UNEP)
 For Indicator 14.3.1: Intergovernmental Oceanographic Commission (IOC) of UNESCO
 For all Indicators under Targets 14.4, 14.6, 14.7 and 14.b: Food and Agriculture Organization of the United Nations (FAO)
 For Indicator 14.5.1: UN Environment World Conservation Monitoring Centre (UNEP-WCMC), BirdLife International (BLI) and International Union for Conservation of Nature (IUCN)
 For Indicator 14.a.1: Intergovernmental Oceanographic Commission of UNESCO
 For Indicator 14.c.1: Division for Ocean Affairs and the Law of the Sea, Office of Legal Affairs, United Nations Secretariat

Monitoring and progress 
UNEP has published a step-by-step guide on measuring the following indicators of SDG: 14.1.1 (Index of coastal eutrophication; and plastic debris density), 14.2.1 (number of countries using ecosystem-based approaches to managing marine areas) and 14.5.1 (coverage of protected areas in relation to marine areas). The guide stresses that marine ecosystems and biodiversity are much less poorly understood compared to terrestrial systems. This is because most marine ecosystems are remote, vast in size and difficult to access. Therefore, marine research is expensive. The environmental dimension of the SDG indicators is new compared to the Millennium Development Goals. For this reason, systems to capture nationally derived environmental data for the SDGs are not well developed yet.

An annual report is prepared by the Secretary-General of the United Nations evaluating the progress towards the Sustainable Development Goals.

The Preparatory Meeting to the UN Ocean Conference convened in New York, US, in February 2017, to discuss the implementation of Sustainable Development Goal 14. International law, as reflected in the UN Convention on the Law of the Sea (UNCLOS), stressed the need to include governance instruments to consider "anthropogenic activities taking place outside of the ocean". Concerns regarding ocean health in destructive fishing practices and marine pollution were discussed, in looking at the role of local communities of small island developing States (SIDS) and least developed countries (LDCs) to not forget that oceans are a large part of their economies.

Although many participating United Nations legislative bodies comes together to discuss the issues around marine environments and SDG 14, such as at the United Nations Ocean Conference, it is important to consider how SDG 14 is implemented across different Multilateral Environmental Agreements, respectively. As climate, biodiversity and land degradation are major parts of the issues surrounding the deterioration of marine environments and oceans, it is important to know how each Rio Convention implements this SDG.

Predictions 
Target 14.1 is supposed to be met in 2025, but in 2020 this is considered to be "uncertain" according to the Convention on Biological Diversity. It was estimated in 2020 that only 2 percent of countries will meet Target 14 by 2030.

Challenges

Large-Scale Marine Protected Areas (LSMPAs) 
Assigning Large-Scale Marine Protected Areas (LSMPAs) (at least 100,000 square km in area) aims to reduce the consequences of resource exploitation (e.g. overfishing) and to protect ocean ecosystems by reducing human disturbance in designated areas. However, there are related concerns surrounding LSMPAs that need attention in order to help ensure that the targets for SDG 14 can be met. These concerns cover three dimensions: resource management, conflicts between rival countries, and tradeoffs between people's needs and the environment. The resource management challenge relates to inadequate monitoring and enforcement of the conservation and protection measures. Rivalries between neighboring countries relates to border disputes surrounding assignment of the LSMPAs. Usually LSMPAs involve multiple countries making up disparate adjoined geographic areas. Some countries might use LSMPAs as diplomatic leverage to pursue other advantages. Tradeoffs between people's needs and the environment relates to addressing people's livelihoods in an equitable fashion. The setting of protective areas can have negative effects on local fisheries and people's incomes.

Capacity-enhancing fishery subsidies 
Capacity-enhancing subsidies have been provided to developing countries in order to make them more competitive with large fishing nations. But if these subsidies result in overfishing, undermining the ecological resilience of the resource, there will be no long-term benefits to the communities. Capacity-enhancing subsidies can only solve immediate poverty conditions for the moment. Monitoring of the impact of the subsidies is necessary to ensure that overfishing is not occurring. Also, strict agreements between countries are required since marine ecosystems cross national boundaries. The World Trade Organization is dedicated to implementing Target 6 of SDG 14 ("End subsidies contributing to overfishing") and discontinue fishery subsidies. The basis for this is that over 93 percent of the global fisheries stocks are already fully exploited.

Impacts of COVID-19 pandemic 
The COVID-19 pandemic in 2020 had a positive impact on oceans since the human activity was lower and presented an opportunity for a sustainable recovery path.

Furthermore, the COVID-19 pandemic has exacerbated the usage of single use plastics such as masks, sanitizer containers, gloves, and much more, in many places world-wide, specifically within Africa. It is estimated that 12 billion single-used face masks are being thrown out monthly which poses a large threat to human health and the surrounding environment, due to informal waste management in many African countries.

Links with other SDGs 
Climate action (SDG 13) is used as a way of protecting the world's oceans. The increase in levels of greenhouse gases leading to changes in climate negatively affects the world's oceans and marine coastal communities. The resulting impacts of rising sea levels by 20 centimeters since the start of the 20th century and the increase of ocean acidity by 30% since the Industrial Revolution has contributed to the melting of ice sheets through the thermal expansion of sea water.

Climate impacts on marine ecosystem services related to primary industries that provide food, income and livelihood to people have direct implications for a range of SDGs. These SDGs include 'no poverty' (SDG 1), 'zero hunger' (SDG 2), 'Good Health and Well-being' (SDG 3), 'decent work and economic growth' (SDG 8), 'reduced inequalities' (SDG 10) and 'responsible consumption and production' (SGD 12). Specifically, achieving SDG 14 would help to achieve the following targets of other SDGs: 1.5, 2.1, 2.3, 8, 13.1. To achieve "zero hunger", there is a need to regulate the fishing policy and control overfishing.

There is an increase of evidence of microplastics within bottled water and seafood, This connects Goal 14 with Goal 6, "clean water and sanitation for all" due to the release of micro plastics into water sources and agricultural soils.

Links between food security and SDG 14 are documented, especially as it is important to SGD 1 and 2. This can be seen through Target 1.2 which attempts to reduce poverty in half by 2030. Women, who are often the primary providers, rely on fish for income and for food. In many cases, fisheries are important for economic stability.

Sustainable Development Goal 14 has been incorporated into the Convention on Biological Diversity (CBD), the United Nations Framework Convention on Climate Change (UNFCCC), and the United Nations Convention to Combat Desertification (UNCCD).

There are some tradeoff or controversy between the SDG14 and social justice. It's crucial for people to understand the importance of find balance in economic benefits and ecological sustainability. This is seen in Target 14.5 through Marine Protected Areas (MPAs): although they have proven to have a positive impact on food security, MPAs are often managed and designed in such a way that excludes women. This can negatively affect the work done in SDG 5 which aims at gender equality and economic empowerment.

A major concern in achieving the 2030 agenda for sustainable development, is the lack of representation for ecosystem health. The effects of a healthy ecosystem, particularly in the context of an ocean, can trickle down and fulfill several initiatives within various SDG targets. A healthy, diverse ecosystem, particularly in coastal areas can serve to provide a variety of essential goods and services that are beneficial for human wellbeing. For example, bioactive compounds existing within marine flora and fauna, as well as the derivation of pharmaceutical and nutraceuticals, are all important for human health. In order to properly conserve and use the ocean's resources sustainably, it may require rebuilding marine life support systems. Based on past conservation efforts, the possibility of recovery for the abundance, structure, and function of marine life is not out of reach, assuming the effects of climate change are controlled. It is suggested that putting ocean ecosystem health at the forefront of our concerns can help us achieve other goals across several SDGs. It is important to note, however, that the achievement of short-term objectives does not necessarily imply long-term sustainability. As an example, short-term objectives such as easing hunger within developing nations can be undermined by large-scale concerns such as poor ocean health. By ensuring that the resources provided by the oceans are responsibly maintained, it could help contribute towards Sustainable Development Goals 1, 2, 3, 5, 6, and more, especially for nations that are highly dependant on the ocean's resources. It is also important that international environmental laws are adjusted to accommodate for marine environmental protection targets in order to foster interconnections between various ecosystems such as oceans, climates, and terrestrial environments.

See also 

 Ocean
 Effect of climate change on oceans

References

External links
One Planet One Ocean course by SDG Academy
UN Sustainable Development Knowledge Platform – SDG 14
“Global Goals” Campaign - SDG 14 
SDG-Track.org - SDG 14

Sustainable development
Sustainable Development Goals
Ocean pollution